The Feast of the Holy Name of Jesus is a feast of the liturgical year celebrated by Christians on varying dates.

History
The feast of the Holy Name of Jesus has been celebrated in the Roman Catholic Church, at least at local levels, since the end of the fifteenth century. The celebration has been held on different dates, usually in January, because 1 January, eight days after Christmas, commemorates the naming of the child Jesus; as recounted in the Gospel read on that day, "at the end of eight days, when he was circumcised, he was called Jesus, the name given by the angel before he was conceived in the womb." Medieval Catholicism, and many Christian churches to the present day, therefore celebrated both events as the Feast of the Circumcision of Christ, usually on 1 January.  An Office and Mass were approved by Pope Sixtus IV.

Observance of the feast was officially granted to the Franciscans in 1530 and spread over a great part of the Church. The Franciscans, Carmelites, and Augustinians kept the feast on 14 January, the Dominicans on 15 January. At Salisbury, York, and Durham in England, and at Aberdeen in Scotland it was celebrated 7 August, at Liège in Belgium, 31 January, at Compostela in Spain and Cambrai in France, 8 January.

Around 1643 the Carthusians obtained the second Sunday after Epiphany for the Feast. This was the date assigned to the celebration when, on 20 December 1721, it was inserted into the General Calendar of the Roman Rite by Pope Innocent XIII. In the reform of Pope Pius X, enacted by his motu proprio Abhinc duos annos of 23 October 1913, it was moved to the Sunday between 2 and 5 January inclusive, and in years when no such Sunday existed the celebration was observed on 2 January; this is still observed by Catholics following calendars of 1914 to 1962.

The reform of the liturgical calendar by the motu proprio Mysterii Paschalis of 14 February 1969 removed the feast "since the imposition of the name of Jesus is already commemorated in the office of the Octave of Christmas." However, the Mass texts of the Holy Name of Jesus were preserved, being placed with the Votive Masses. The celebration was restored to the General Roman Calendar with the 2002 Roman Missal.

Present day
In the Latin Rite Catholic Church it is observed as an optional memorial on 3 January by Catholics following the present General Roman Calendar.  According to the 1962 Missal of St. John XXIII used in the Extraordinary Form of the Roman Rite the feast is celebrated on January 2. In Roman Catholicism the month of January is traditionally dedicated to the Holy Name of Jesus.

The Jesuits celebrate the Holy Name of Jesus on 3 January as the order's titular feast. 

In the Lutheran Church, the Feast of the Holy Name of Jesus is sometimes celebrated as a part of the Feast of the Circumcision of Christ on 1 January.

In some Anglican churches including the Episcopal Church (United States), the feast is observed on 1 January. In the Book of Common Prayer of the Episcopal Church of the United States of America since 1979, the Feast of the Circumcision of Christ celebrated on 1 January is now listed as the "Feast of the Holy Name of Our Lord Jesus Christ". In the Church of England, the calendar of the 1662 Book of Common Prayer stipulates a festival "The Name of Jesus" to be observed on 7 August as had been the practice in Durham, Salisbury and York, but in the more recent Common Worship resources the Feast of the Circumcision and Naming of Christ (1 January) takes its place as the primary festival of the name of Jesus. The Anglican Church of Canada's 'Book of Common Prayer' (1962) retains the date of 7 August, but as a commemoration, not a feast day. Many Eastern Churches celebrate the feast on 1 January.

The United Methodist Church observes the Feast of the Holy Name of Jesus on 1 January, with the liturgical colour of the day being white/gold.

The Presbyterian Church (USA) (https://www.pcusa.org/) observes the Feast of the Holy Name of Jesus on January 1.

See also

Litany of the Holy Name
Feast of the Circumcision of Christ
Solemnity of Mary, Mother of God

References

External links

Catholic holy days
Lutheran liturgy and worship
Christmastide
January observances
August observances
Christian festivals and holy days